Youssef Akrout (born 15 November 1990, in Tunis) is a Tunisian sailor. He competed at the 2012 and 2016 Summer Olympics in the Men's Laser class.  

After winning the Laser event at the 2011 All-Africa Games, Akrout was the only Tunisian sailing competitor at the 2012 Summer Olympics.  He gained a place for Tunisia in the men's Laser event at the 2016 Olympics through his performance at the 2014 World Championship.  He also won the 2015 African Laser and Laser Radial Championship.

References

1990 births
Living people
Olympic sailors of Tunisia
Tunisian male sailors (sport)
Sailors at the 2012 Summer Olympics – Laser
Sailors at the 2016 Summer Olympics – Laser
African Games gold medalists for Tunisia
African Games medalists in sailing
Competitors at the 2011 All-Africa Games
20th-century Tunisian people
21st-century Tunisian people